Whitney and Thayer Woods is a nature reserve and forest located in Cohasset and Hingham, Massachusetts.  The property is owned by The Trustees of Reservations.  It is adjacent to the Weir River Farm, also owned by The Trustees, and Turkey Hill, a town-owned property managed by The Trustees.

History
In the 17th century, the “Common Lands of the Hingham Planters” was divided into long strips for logging and farming.

References

External links 
 The Trustees of Reservations: Whitney and Thayer Woods
 Trail map

The Trustees of Reservations
Open space reserves of Massachusetts
Protected areas of Plymouth County, Massachusetts
Forests of Massachusetts